Plympton is a town in Devon, England.

It may also refer to:

Place names
Plympton, Massachusetts, a town in the United States
Plympton, Nova Scotia, Canada
Plympton Station, Nova Scotia, Canada
 Plympton, a former township, now part of Plympton–Wyoming, Ontario, Canada
Plympton, South Australia, a suburb of the city of Adelaide, South Australia
 Plympton, an area of East Fremantle, Western Australia

People
Bill Plympton, the animator of Plymptoons
John Plympton, English Member of Parliament

Companies
 Plympton, Inc., a literary studio

See also
Plimpton (disambiguation)